Among the several native ethnic groups of Japan, the predominant group are the Yamato Japanese, who trace their origins back to the Yayoi period and have held political dominance since the Asuka period. Other historical ethnic groups have included the Ainu, the Ryukyuan people, the Emishi, and the Hayato; some of whom were dispersed or absorbed by other groups. Ethnic groups that inhabited the Japanese islands during prehistory include the Jomon people and lesser-known Paleolithic groups. In more recent history, a number of immigrants from other countries have made their home in Japan. According to census statistics in 2018, 97.8% of the population of Japan are Japanese, with the remainder being foreign nationals residing in Japan. The number of foreign workers has been increased dramatically in recent years, due to the aging population and the lack of labor force. A news article in 2018 states that approximately 1 out of 10 young people residing in Tokyo are foreign nationals.

Demographics 

About 2.3% of Japan's total legal resident population are foreign citizens. Of these, according to 2020 data from the Japanese government, the principal groups are as follows.

The above statistics do not include the approximately 30,000 U.S. military stationed in Japan, nor do they account for illegal immigrants. The statistics also do not take into account minority groups who are Japanese citizens such as the Ainu (an aboriginal people primarily living in Hokkaido), the Ryukyuans (from the Ryukyu Islands south of mainland Japan), naturalized citizens from backgrounds including but not limited to Korean and Chinese, and citizen descendants of immigrants. The total legal resident population of 2012 is estimated at 127.6 million.

Notion of ethnic homogeneity in Japan
After the demise of the multi-ethnic Empire of Japan in 1945, successive governments had forged a single Japanese identity by advocating monoculturalism and denying the existence of more than one ethnic group in Japan. It was not until 2019 when the Japanese parliament passed an act to recognize the Ainu people to be indigenous. However, the notion of ethnic homogeneity was so ingrained in Japan, to which the former Prime Minister Taro Aso (1940-), in 2020, notably claimed in an election campaign speech that “No other country but this one has lasted for as long as 2,000 years with one language, one ethnic group and one dynasty”.

Pioneering remarks about ethnic rights was first made by Prime Minister Fukuda Yasuo on 20 May 2008, who stated at the parliament, "We acknowledge the Ainu to be an ethnic minority as it has maintained a unique cultural identity and having a unique language and religion."

Native Japanese people

Ainu

The Ainu people (also Aynu) are an indigenous people native to Hokkaido and northeastern Honshu, as well as the nearby Russian Sakhalin and Kuril Islands (both formerly part of the Japanese Empire), and Kamchatka Peninsula. They possess a language distinct from modern Japanese. They traditionally practiced tattooing and followed religious beliefs that are considered animism.

Ōbeikei (Bonin) Islanders

The Ōbeikei Islanders are an ethnic group native to the Bonin Islands (also called the Ogasawara Islands), part of Tokyo Prefecture. They are descendants of Westerners, Polynesians, and Kanaks who settled Hahajima and Chichijima in the 18th century. They speak a dialect of English, called Bonin English, and have traditionally practiced Christianity. Legal status of Bonin Islanders passed back and forth between the United States and Japan over the years and, during and after World War II, many Bonin Islanders were forced to leave their homes. Some emigrated to the United States, finding it easier to assimilate into an English-speaking Western culture than a Japanese-speaking Asian one. Today, roughly 200 Bonin Islanders remain in Japan, some still bearing the surnames of the original 18th-century settlers.

Yamato

The Yamato people are the dominant native ethnic group of Japan and because of their numbers, the term Yamato is often used interchangeably with the term Japanese.

Ryukyuans

The Ryukyuan people (also Lewchewan) are an indigenous people native to the Ryukyu Islands. There are different subgroups of the Ryukyuan ethnic group, the Okinawan, Amami, Miyako, Yaeyama and Yonaguni peoples. Their languages comprise the Ryukyuan languages, one of the two branches of the Japonic language family (the other being Japanese and its dialects). The Ryukyuans have a distinct culture with some matriarchal elements, native religion, and cuisine which had fairly late (12th century) introduction of rice.

East Asian

Chinese

Chinese people in Japan are the largest foreign minorities in Japan. They comprise 0.64% of Japan's population. Chinese people are mostly concentrated in the Osaka, Tokyo and Yokohama areas.

Koreans

Koreans in Japan are the fifth largest ethnic minorities in the country. Most of them arrived in the early 20th century.

As of 2012, there are 530,421 Koreans in Japan who are not Japanese citizens.

Mongolians

Orok

Nivkh
A small number of Nivkh people resettled in Hokkaido when Japan evacuated southern Sakhalin at the end of World War II.

South Asian
South Asians in Japan live mostly in Tokyo.

Bangladeshis

Indians

Nepalis

Pakistanis

Sri Lankans

Southeast Asian

Filipinos

Filipinos in Japan formed a population of 202,592 individuals at year-end 2007, making them Japan's third-largest foreign community along with Brazilians, according to the statistics of the Ministry of Justice. In 2006, Japanese/Filipino marriages were the most frequent of all international marriages in Japan. As of March 12, 2011, the Filipino population of Japan was 305,972. As of April 1, 2020, the number of Filipinos in Japan is estimated at 325,000.

Burmese

Vietnamese

448,053 Vietnamese people were living in Japan by the end of 2020.

Indonesians

West Asian

Iranians

Kurds

Turks

Arabs

Europeans

British

French

Irish

Russians

West African

Nigerians

Ghanaians

North American

Americans

South American

Brazilians

There is a significant community of Brazilians in Japan, which is home to the second largest Brazilian community outside of Brazil. They also constitute the largest number of Portuguese speakers in Asia, even greater than those of formerly Portuguese East Timor, Macao and Goa combined. Likewise, Brazil maintains its status as home to the largest Japanese community outside of Japan.

Peruvians

Like Brazilians in Japan, there are Peruvians in Japan, some of them lived in Peru when the country opened their doors for foreign workers. Alberto Fujimori is one example of Peruvian Japanese.

Notes

References